Type 11 may refer to:
Type 11 assault rifle, Thai copy of HK33
Type 11 light machine gun, Japanese light machine gun
Type 11 (missile), a Japanese surface-to-air missile
Type 11 37 mm infantry gun, a Japanese gun
Type 11 75 mm AA gun, a Japanese anti-aircraft gun
Type 11 70 mm infantry mortar, a Japanese mortar
14 cm/40 11th Year Type naval gun, a Japanese naval gun
Datsun Type 11, a small car manufactured by Datsun/Nissan